A clavicle fracture, also known as a broken collarbone, is a bone fracture of the clavicle. Symptoms typically include pain at the site of the break and a decreased ability to move the affected arm. Complications can include a collection of air in the pleural space surrounding the lung (pneumothorax), injury to the nerves or blood vessels in the area, and an unpleasant appearance.

It is often caused by a fall onto a shoulder, outstretched arm, or direct trauma. The fracture can also occur in a baby during childbirth. The middle section of the clavicle is most often involved. Diagnosis is typically based on symptoms and confirmed with X-rays.

Clavicle fractures are typically treated by putting the arm in a sling for one or two weeks. Pain medication such as paracetamol (acetaminophen) may be useful. It can take up to five months for the strength of the bone to return to normal. Reasons for surgical repair include an open fracture, involvement of the nerves or blood vessels, or shortening of the clavicle by more than 1.5 cm in a young person.

Clavicle fractures most commonly occur in people under the age of 25 and those over the age of 70. Among the younger group males are more often affected than females. In adults they make up about 5% of all fractures while in children they represent about 13% of fractures.

Signs and symptoms
 Pain, particularly with arm movement or on the front part of upper chest
 Swelling
 Often, after the swelling has subsided, the fracture can be felt through the skin.
 Sharp pain when any movement is made
 Referred pain:  dull to extreme ache in and around clavicle area, including surrounding muscles
 Possible nausea, dizziness, and/or spotty vision due to extreme pain

Mechanism

Clavicle fractures are commonly known as a breaking of the collarbone, and they are usually a result of injury or trauma. The most common type of fracture occurs when a person falls vertically onto the shoulder or with an outstretched hand. A direct hit to the collarbone can also cause a break obviously. In most cases, the direct hit occurs from the joint side towards the body side of the bone. The muscles involved in clavicle fractures include the deltoid, trapezius, subclavius, sternocleidomastoid, and sternohyoid. The ligaments involved include the conoid ligament and trapezoid ligament. Incidents that may lead to a clavicle fracture include automobile accidents, biking accidents (especially common in mountain biking), vertical falls on the shoulder joint, or contact sports such as football, rugby, hurling, or wrestling.

It is most often fractured in the middle third of its length which is its weakest point. The lateral fragment of the clavicle during a fracture is depressed by the weight of the arm and is pulled downward by the strong abductor muscles of the shoulder joint, especially the deltoid. The part of the clavicle near the center of the body is tilted upwards by the sternocleidomastoid muscle. Children and infants are particularly prone to it. Newborns often present clavicle fractures following a difficult delivery.

After fracture of the clavicle, the sternocleidomastoid muscle elevates the medial fragment of the bone. The trapezius muscle is unable to hold up the distal fragment owing to the weight of the upper limb,  thus the shoulder droops. The adductor muscles of the arm, such as the pectoralis major, may pull the distal fragment medially, causing the bone fragments to override.

Anatomy

The clavicle is the bone that connects the trunk of the body to the arm, and it is located directly above the first rib. A clavicle is located on each side of the front, upper part of the chest. The clavicle consists of a medial end, a shaft, and a lateral end. The medial end connects with the manubrium of the sternum and gives attachments to the fibrous capsule of the sternoclavicular joint, articular disc, and interclavicular ligament. The lateral end connects at the acromion of the scapula which is referred to as the acromioclavicular joint. The clavicle forms a slight S-shaped curve where it curves from the sternal end laterally and anteriorly for near half its length, then forming a posterior curve to the acromion of the scapula.

Diagnosis
The basic method to check for a clavicle fracture is by an X-ray of the clavicle to determine the fracture type and extent of injury. In former times, X-rays were taken of both clavicle bones for comparison purposes. Due to the curved shape in a tilted plane X-rays are typically oriented with ~15° upwards facing tilt from the front. In more severe cases, a computerized tomography (CT) or magnetic resonance imaging (MRI) scan is taken.
However, the standard method of diagnosis through ultrasound imaging performed in the emergency room may be equally accurate in children.

Treatment
Medication may be prescribed for pain. It is unclear if surgery or conservative management is superior. Antibiotics and tetanus vaccination may be used if the bone breaks through the skin; however, this is uncommon. Often, they are treated without surgery. In severe cases, surgery may be done.

Nonoperative
The arm is usually supported by an external immobilizer to keep the joint stable and decrease the risk of further damage. The two most common types of fixation are the figure-of-eight splint that wraps the shoulders to keep them forced back and a simple broad arm sling (which supports the weight of the arm). The primary indication is pain relief. Type of sling used does not seem to affect the results as far as healing is concerned but patient satisfaction is lower with the figure-of-eight bandage. No difference in functional outcome has been reported between the two types of immobilization.
         
Current practice for simple fractures without great displacement is generally to provide a sling, and pain relief, and to allow the bone to heal itself, monitoring progress with X-rays every week or few weeks if necessary.  Surgery is employed in 5–10% of cases. However, a meta-analysis of 2 144 midshaft clavicle fractures supports primary plate fixation of completely displaced midshaft clavicular fractures in active adult patients.

If the fracture is at the lateral end, the risk of nonunion is greater than if the fracture is of the shaft.

Surgical

For breaks in the middle of the clavicle in children surgery resulted in faster recover but more complications. The evidence for different types of surgery for breaks of the middle part of the clavicle is poor as of 2015.

Surgery may be considered when one or more of the following is presents
 Comminution with separation (bone is broken into multiple pieces)
 Skin penetration (open fracture)
 Associated nervous and vascular trauma (brachial plexus or supraclavicular nerves)
 Nonunion after several months (3–6 months, typically)
 Displaced distal third fractures (high risk of nonunion)
 Although shortening (as a result of overlap of fracture ends) has often been suggested as an indication for surgery, a review found that people treated without surgery for shortening of mid shaft clavicle fractures did not affect outcomes.

A discontinuity in the bone shape often results from a clavicular fracture, visible through the skin, if not treated with surgery.  Surgical procedures often call for open reduction internal [plate] fixation where an anatomically shaped titanium or steel plate is affixed along the superior aspect of the bone by several screws. In some cases, the plate is removed after healing due to discomfort, to avoid tissue aggravation, osteolysis or subacromial impingement. This is especially important with a special type of fixation plate called hook plate. With anatomical plates plate removal is considered an elective procedure that is rarely necessary. An alternative to plate fixation is elastic TEN intramedullary nailing. These devices are implanted within the clavicle's canal to support the bone from the inside. Typical surgical complications are infection, neurological symptoms distal the incision (sometimes to the extremity), and nonunion of the bone (failure of the bone to properly fuse together).

Prognosis

Healing time varies based on age, health, complexity, and location of the break, as well as the bone displacement.  For adults, one to several weeks of sling immobilization is normally employed to allow for pain relief, initial bone and soft tissue healing; teenagers require slightly less, while children can often achieve the same level in two weeks.  During this period, patients may remove the sling to practice passive pendulum range of motion exercises to reduce atrophy in the elbow and shoulder, but they are often minimized to 15–20° off vertical. Depending on the severity of fracture, a person can begin to use the arm if comfortable with movement and no pain results. The final goal is to be able to have full range of motion with no pain; therefore, if any pain occurs, allowing for more recovery time is best. Depending on severity of the fracture, athletes involved in contact sports may need a longer period of rest to heal to avoid refracturing bone. A person should be able to return unrestricted to any sports or work by 3 months after the injury.

Epidemiology
Clavicle fractures occur at 30–64 cases per 100,000 a year and are responsible for 2.6–5.0% of all fractures. This type of fracture occurs more often in males. About half of all clavicle fractures occur in children under the age of seven and is the most common pediatric fracture. Clavicle fractures involve roughly 5% of all fractures seen in hospital emergency admissions. Clavicles are the most commonly broken bone in the human body.

History
Hippocrates, 4th century BC:

From an ancient Egyptian text of approximately the 30th century B.C., in a copy known as the Edwin Smith papyrus, J. Breasted translation, case 35: 

All the cases in this text describe examination, prognosis, and (where applicable) treatment, in that order.

References

External links 
 Details from AAOS

Bone fractures
Injuries of shoulder and upper arm
Wikipedia medicine articles ready to translate